Major poetry related events taking place worldwide during 2020 are outlined below under different sections. This includes poetry books released during the year in different languages, major literary awards, poetry festivals and events, besides anniversaries and deaths of renowned poets etc. Nationality words link to articles with information on the nation's poetry or literature (for instance, India or France).

Events
 January 27–February 1 – The National Cowboy Poetry Gathering is organised by Western Folklife Center in Nevada with live musical performances.

Selection of works published in English

Australia
 Clive James, The Fire of Joy
Ellen van Neerven, Throat

Canada
 J.R. Carpenter, This is a Picture of Wind

India
 Antony Theodore, I Am Your Baby, Mother
 Arvind Krishna Mehrotra, Selected Poems
 Ranjit Hoskote, Open Your Eyes
 Tapan Kumar Pradhan, Kalahandi - The Untold Story
 Tishani Doshi, Small Days and NightsNigeria
 Caleb Femi, PoorUnited Kingdom
 Bhanu Kapil, How to Wash a Heart Caroline Bird, The Air Year Eavan Boland, The Historians Sean Hewitt, Tongues of Fire Simon Armitage, Magnetic Field: The Marsden PoemsUnited States
 Amanda Lovelace, Break Your Glass Slippers Claudia Rankine, Just Us Eliza Griswold, If Men, Then Lili Reinhart, Swimming Lessons Natalie Diaz, Postcolonial Love PoemAnthologies in Canada

New Zealand

Poets in Best New Zealand Poems

United Kingdom

England

Northern Ireland

Scotland

Anthologies in the United Kingdom

Criticism, scholarship and biography in the United Kingdom

United StatesAlphabetical listing by author nameAnthologies in the United States
 Natalie Diaz, Postcolonial Love Poem Robert Hass, Summer Snow: New PoemsCriticism, scholarship and biography in the United States

Poets in The Best American Poetry 2018

Works published in other languages

Awards and honors by country
See also: List of poetry awards
Awards announced this year:

International
 Struga Poetry Evenings Golden Wreath Laureate : Amir Or

Australia awards and honors
 Judith Wright Calanthe Award: П. O. for HeideKenneth Slessor Prize for Poetry: Peter Boyle for Enfolded in the Wings of a Great DarknessMiles Franklin Award: Tara June Winch for The YieldVictorian Premier's Prize for Poetry: Charmaine Papertalk Green for Nganajungu YaguCanada awards and honors
 Archibald Lampman Award: Ben Ladouceur for Mad Long Emotion J. M. Abraham Poetry Award: 
 Governor General's Awards: 
 Griffin Poetry Prize : Kaie Kellough for Magnetic Equator Latner Writers' Trust Poetry Prize: 
 Gerald Lampert Award: 
 Pat Lowther Award: 
 Prix Alain-Grandbois: 
 Raymond Souster Award: 
 Dorothy Livesay Poetry Prize: 
 Prix Émile-Nelligan:

France awards and honors
Prix Goncourt de la Poésie:

India awards and honors
Sahitya Akademi Award : Arundhathi Subramaniam for When God is a Traveler (English) & Anamika for Tokri Mein Digant (Hindi)

New Zealand awards and honors
 Prime Minister's Awards for Literary Achievement:
 Fiction: Tessa Duder
 Nonfiction: Tīmoti Kāretu
 Poetry: Jenny Bornholdt
 Mary and Peter Biggs Award for Poetry: Helen Rickerby for How to LiveUnited Kingdom awards and honors
 Cholmondeley Award: Bhanu Kapil
 Costa Award (formerly "Whitbread Awards") for poetry: Eavan Boland for The Historians English Association's Fellows' Poetry Prizes:
 Eric Gregory Award (for a collection of poems by a poet under the age of 30):
 Forward Poetry Prize:
Best Collection: 
Shortlist: 
Best First Collection:
Shortlist: 
Best Poem:
Shortlist:
 Jerwood Aldeburgh First Collection Prize for poetry:
Shortlist:
 Manchester Poetry Prize: James Pollock
 National Poet of Wales: 
 National Poetry Competition : Marvin Thompson for The Fruit of the Spirit is Love Queen's Gold Medal for Poetry: 
 T. S. Eliot Prize : Bhanu Kapil for How to Wash a HeartUnited States awards and honors
 Arab American Book Award (The George Ellenbogen Poetry Award):
Honorable Mentions: 
 Agnes Lynch Starrett Poetry Prize:
 Anisfield-Wolf Book Award: 
 Best Translated Book Award (BTBA):
 Beatrice Hawley Award from Alice James Books:
 Bollingen Prize: 
 Jackson Poetry Prize: 
 Lambda Literary Award:
 Gay Poetry: 
 Lesbian Poetry: 
 Lenore Marshall Poetry Prize: 
 Los Angeles Times Book Prize: 
Finalists: 
 National Book Award for Poetry (NBA):
NBA Finalists:
NBA Longlist: 
NBA Judges: 
 National Book Critics Circle Award for Poetry: 
 The New Criterion Poetry Prize: 
 Pulitzer Prize for Poetry (United States) : Jericho Brown for The Tradition'' 
 Wallace Stevens Award: 
 Whiting Awards: 
 PEN Award for Poetry in Translation: 
 PEN Center USA 2018 Poetry Award: 
 PEN/Voelcker Award for Poetry:                     
 Raiziss/de Palchi Translation Award:
 Ruth Lilly Poetry Prize: 
 Kingsley Tufts Poetry Award: 
 Walt Whitman Prize –         – Judge: 
 Yale Younger Series:

From the Poetry Society of America
 Frost Medal: 
 Shelley Memorial Award: 
 Writer Magazine/Emily Dickinson Award:
 Lyric Poetry Award:
 Alice Fay Di Castagnola Award: 
 Louise Louis/Emily F. Bourne Student Poetry Award: 
 George Bogin Memorial Award: 
 Robert H. Winner Memorial Award: 
 Cecil Hemley Memorial Award:
 Norma Farber First Book Award: 
 Lucille Medwick Memorial Award: 
 William Carlos Williams Award:

Deaths
Birth years link to the corresponding "[year] in poetry" article:

 February 4 – Kamau Brathwaite (b. 1930), Caribbean poet
 February 17 – Ror Wolf (b. 1932), German poet and writer
 February 18 – Seda Vermisheva (b. 1932), Armenian-Russian poet, economist and activist
 February 21 – Lisel Mueller (b. 1924), German-American poet and translator
 April 1 – Bruce Dawe (b. 1930), Australian poet
 April 27 – Eavan Boland (b. 1944), Irish poet and author 
 May 4 – Michael McClure (b. 1932), American poet, playwright and songwriter
 June 12 – Anand Mohan Zutshi Gulzar Dehlvi (b. 1926), Indian Urdu poet
 July 31 – ruth weiss (b. 1928), German-born American poet of the beat generation
 August 11 – Rahat Indori (b. 1950), Indian Urdu poet and Bollywood lyricist, following Covid-19 infection
 September 14 – Anne Stevenson (b. 1933), American-British poet
 October 1 – Derek Mahon, (b. 1941), Irish poet
 October 25 – Diane Di Prima (b. 1934), American poet of the beat generation
 November 10 – Carlo Bordini (b. 1938), Italian poet
 December 14 – Marvin Bell (b. 1937), American poet
 December 23 – Sugathakumari (b. 1934), Indian Malayalam poet and activist

See also

 Poetry
 List of years in poetry
 List of poetry awards

References

2020s in poetry
2020 poems
2020s poems
 
2020-related lists
Culture-related lists by year